The following is a list of all IFT-licensed over-the-air television stations broadcasting in the Mexican state of Oaxaca.

List of television stations

|-

|-

|-

|-

|-

|-

|-

|-

|-

|-

|-

|-

|-

|-

|-

|-

|-

|-

|-

|-

|-

|-

|-

|-

|-

|-

|-

Notes

References

Television stations in Oaxaca
Oaxaca